Seen a Ghost is an album by the American alternative rock band Honeydogs, released in 1997. It was the band's first album for a major label.

The band supported the album by opening for INXS on a North American tour.

Production
Recorded at Pachyderm Studios, the album was produced by Tom Herbers and the band, and mixed by Nick DiDia. Al Kooper contributed Hammond organ.

Critical reception

Stereo Review called the album "this decade's freshest-sounding blast of folk-rock neoclassicism." The Lincoln Journal Star wrote that "this is a pure-pop band, one that cheerfully raids country, rock, r&b and psychedelia." Werner Trieschmann, of the Arkansas Democrat-Gazette, considered the band one of the first of an inevitable wave of copies of the Wallflowers, writing that "this one won't be the worst, I can guarantee, but that's not an endorsement either."

The Palm Beach Post deemed Honeydogs "a real rock band," writing that "no frills guitars combine with the gentle purr of a Wurlitzer or the drone of a fiddle for extra flavor." The Milwaukee Journal Sentinel listed Seen a Ghost as the fifth best album of 1997, writing that it "sidles up to an easygoing collection of pop songs and country rockers all of them unassuming, irony-free and irresistible." The St. Paul Pioneer Press opined: "Refusing to give up on the heartland strains that have fueled the group for so long, the Honeydogs are more secure in its abilities."

AllMusic called the album "a charming collection of Beatlesque pop, demonstrating the group's knack for bright, catchy melodies and ringing guitars."

Track listing

References

1997 albums
Mercury Records albums